HMS Ashanti was a  of the Royal Navy. She was named after the Ashanti people, an ethnic group located in Ghana. The frigate was sunk as a target in 1988.

Ashanti was built by Yarrow, of Scotstoun, at a cost of £5,315,000 and was the first commissioned Royal Navy warship to be equipped with combined steam and gas (COSAG) engines. She was launched on 9 March 1959 and commissioned on 23 November 1961.

Operational Service
In 1962 malicious damage was reported aboard Ashanti.

Ashanti deployed to the Caribbean for trials in 1962. There, in early October, the ship suffered a failure in her COSAG engines, forcing the frigate's return to Britain. Subsequent tests discovered that the COSAG's machinery was defective, which caused blade fracturing in the gas turbine. Hull strengthening also found to be required

Ashanti was also used to trial the Westland Wasp helicopter, prior to its introduction to active service in 1964. The frigate conducted operations in the Persian Gulf and Arabian Sea for 10 months in 1963. In May 1965, Ashanti suffered minor damage in a collision with the Russian cargo ship Farab in the port of Mombassa, Kenya.

In 1966/67 Ashanti was deployed on the Beira Patrol. During that time she also spent a month in Aden having a gas turbine refit whilst some of the crew were seconded to the army as Britain withdrew from Aden, for which the crew were awarded the General Service medal with South Arabia clasp. There was also a visit to the Kuria Muria Islands, before going on to Bahrain and Kuwait. Given the Six-Day War, the Suez Canal being blocked, indecisiveness about whether to clear mines from the Gulf of Aqaba Ashanti headed home via the Cape of Good Hope, stopping off at Simon's Town. Paragraph by onboard rating REM Bryant

In 1969 Ashanti embarked a Royal Marines Commando detachment at Bermuda during a Black Power Conference.

In 1970, Ashanti deployed on Beira Patrol, which was designed to prevent oil reaching landlocked Rhodesia via the Portuguese colony of Mozambique. The following year Ashanti was present at the Royal Navy's withdrawal from Malta. In 1974, while returning to Britain from the Caribbean, Ashanti suffered two fatalities when a large wave struck the frigate. The ship was just four hours out of Bermuda on her way back to the UK when hit by the wave. One was lost at sea, while the other suffered injuries and died aboard the frigate. The ship returned to Bermuda to disembark the body, and for repairs to the upper deck structure. Premature reports by Bermudian radio stations sent invalid signals to UK and it was reported on national TV news channels that Ashanti had been sunk and lost at sea.

Three sailors, Timothy J Burton, David Little and James Wardle, died in 1977 from carbon monoxide poisoning after a fire broke out in a boiler room.

Ashanti was returned to service in 1978 following a repair and refit, and finally placed in reserve and became a Harbour Training Ship.

The submarine HMS Swiftsure was submerged and launched two Sub Harpoon missiles from distance, video footage was taken from a helicopter observing the exercise. Another 'S' Class boat situated between HMS Swiftsure and the target hit the ship with Mk24 torpedoes subsequent to the Sub Harpoons, which broke the back of the ship causing it to break in two and sink.

References

Publications
 
 
 
 

 

Ships built on the River Clyde
Tribal-class frigates
1959 ships